Sports radio (or sports talk radio) is a radio format devoted entirely to discussion and broadcasting of sporting events. A widespread programming genre that has a narrow audience appeal, sports radio is characterized by an often-boisterous on-air style and extensive debate and analysis by both hosts and callers. Many sports talk stations also carry play-by-play (live commentary) of local sports teams as part of their regular programming. Hosted by Bill Mazer, the first sports talk radio show in history launched in March 1964 on New York's WNBC (AM).

Soon after WNBC launched its program, in 1965 Seton Hall University's radio station, WSOU, started Hall Line, a call-in sports radio talk show focusing on the team's basketball program. Having celebrated its 50th anniversary on air during the 2015–2016 season, Hall Line, which broadcasts to central and northern New Jersey as well as all five boroughs of New York, is the oldest and longest running sports talk call-in show in the NY-NJ Metropolitan area, and is believed to be the oldest in the nation.

Enterprise Radio Network became the first national all-sports network, operating out of Avon, Connecticut, from New Year's Day 1981 through late September of that year before going out of business. ER had two channels, one for talk and a second for updates and play-by-play. ER's talk lineup included current New York Yankees voice John Sterling, New York Mets radio host Ed Coleman and former big-league pitcher Bill Denehy.

Emmis Broadcasting's WFAN in New York in 1987 was the first all-sports radio station. The success of the station and its programs, such as Mike and the Mad Dog, caused many to appear around the United States; while only one other radio show besides Mike and the Mad Dog attended the 1990 Super Bowl, about 100 attended the 2004 Super Bowl's radio row.

Sports talk is available in local, network and syndicated forms, is available in multiple languages, and is carried in multiple forms on both major North American satellite radio networks. In the United States, most sports talk-formatted radio stations air syndicated programming from ESPN Radio, SportsMap, Sports Byline USA, Fox Sports Radio, CBS Sports Radio, or NBC Sports Radio, while in the Spanish language, ESPN Deportes Radio is the largest current network. In contrast, Canadian sports talk stations may carry a national brand (such as TSN Radio or Sportsnet Radio) but carry mostly local programming, with American-based shows filling in gaps. Compared to other formats, interactive "talkback" sports radio poses difficulties for Internet radio, since as a live format it is difficult to automate; most prominent sports leagues also place their radio broadcasts behind a paywall or provide their broadcasts directly to the consumer, depriving standalone Internet stations of potential programming. Pre-recorded sports talk programs (usually interview-centered) can be podcasted with relative ease, and sports teams have also launched their own online digital networks with sports talk centered around their own properties.

As with most other radio formats, sports radio uses dayparting. ESPN Radio, for instance, insisted that its affiliates carry Mike and Mike in the Morning during morning drive time to provide as much national clearance as possible; in contrast, it carries less prominent programming in the afternoon drive to accommodate local sports talk, as well as in the evening (for its first two decades, rolling score updates aired under the banner of GameNight) to allow stations to break away for local sporting events. Somewhat unusually for radio, the late-night and overnight hosts have more prominence on a sports talk network, due to a near-complete lack of local preemption; Sports Byline USA, for instance, operates exclusively 

Sports radio stations typically depend on drawing an audience that fits advertiser-friendly key demographics, particularly young men with the disposable income to invest in sports fandom, since the format does not have the broad appeal to reach a critical mass in the general public. Prominent sports radio stations typically get their greatest listenership from live play-by-play of local major professional sports league or college sports franchises; less prominent stations (especially on the AM dial) may not have this option because of poorer (or for daytime-only stations, non-existent) nighttime signals and smaller budgets for rights fees.

In the United States, a variant of the sports radio format focusing on sports betting emerged in 2019 (following the 2018 repeal of the Professional and Amateur Sports Protection Act of 1992), which carry talk programs conducted from the perspective of the activity. In August 2019, SportsMap (then SB Nation Radio) and Vegas Stats & Information Network (VSiN) launched the BetR Network with affiliates in Las Vegas and Atlantic City at launch, while Philadelphia's WDAS adopted a betting-centric format later in the month. Broadcaster Audacy began to deploy its BetQL Network to more of its stations in June 2021 (using the on-air brand The Bet), alongside an expansion of their daily schedule. Stations with such formats may still affiliate with a sports radio network to fill the remainder of their schedule, with the aforementioned WDAS otherwise carrying Fox Sports Radio (as well as Philadelphia Union soccer), BetR including programming from co-owner SportsMap on its lineup, and BetQL being often carried alongside CBS Sports Radio on its owned-and-operated stations.

Sports talk stations

Terrestrial

Australia
 RSN Racing & Sport - Melbourne, Victoria
 1116 SEN - Melbourne, Victoria
 91.3 SportFM - Fremantle, Western Australia
 Sky Sports Radio - Sydney
 ABC Grandstand - national, via DAB+ digital radio

Brazil
 Rádio Grenal FM - 95.9 MHz - Porto Alegre, Rio Grande do Sul - Regional sports news and talk radio in Rio Grande do Sul. Its owned by Rede Pampa de Comunicação.

Canada

China
 Beijing Tiyu Guangbo

Mexico
 W Deportes

New Zealand
Radio Sport
TAB Trackside
SENZ

Nigeria
88.9 Brila FM: Sports Radio 88.9 Brila FM, owned by Brila Broadcasting Services, is Nigeria's first sports radio station and was launched in 2002.

Philippines
DZSR Sports Radio 918 kHz is the first and only sports radio station owned by the Philippine Broadcasting Service.

United States
In 2009, Detroit's "97.1 The Ticket" WXYT-FM, thanks to the surprising time slot dominance of shows like Valenti and Foster, in addition to holding the play-by-play rights for the Detroit Tigers, Detroit Red Wings, Detroit Lions and the Detroit Pistons, became the United States' only sports talk radio station to be the highest rated station in their market, according to Portable People Meter rankings. The station relocated to the FM dial in October 2007 after existing on the AM dial for seven years prior, replacing a Free FM "hot talk" station, WKRK. This ratings success has led to WXYT-FM billing itself as the country's best sports station.

WXYT-FM's recent influence has led to CBS Radio installing sports radio stations on the FM dial in Dallas (105.3 The Fan), Boston (98.5 The Sports Hub), Pittsburgh (93.7 The Fan), Washington, DC (106.7 The Fan), Baltimore (105.7 The Fan) and Cleveland (92.3 The Fan), in addition to simulcasting Philadelphia's heritage 610 WIP onto the former WYSP. Other non-CBS stations have also migrated to the FM dial, most notably Clear Channel's KFAN in Minneapolis, Greater Media's WPEN in Pennsylvania and Dispatch Media's WBNS-FM in Columbus, just to name a few.

K

{| class="wikitable sortable"
|- "
!Call sign
!Branding
!Affiliation
!Ownership
!City
!State
|-
| • KABQ
| Fox Sports 1350
| Fox Sports Radio
| iHeartMedia
| Albuquerque
| New Mexico
|-
| • KAKK
| Fox Sports 1570/93.7
| Fox Sports Radio
| De La Hunt Broadcasting
| Walker
| Minnesota
|-
| • KARN
| The Sports Animal 920
| CBS Sports Radio
| Cumulus Media
| Little Rock
| Arkansas
|-
| • KBCN-FM
| ESPN Arkansas
| ESPN Radio
| Pearson Broadcasting of Marshall, Inc.
| Marshall
| Arkansas
|-
| • KBFP
| Fox Sports 970/800
| Fox Sports Radio
| iHeartMedia
| Bakersfield
| California
|-
| • KBGG
| 101.3 FM & 1700 AM The Champ
| CBS Sports Radio
| Cumulus Media
| Des Moines
| Iowa
|-
| • KBMB
| TUDN Radio Phoenix 710
| TUDN Radio
| Entravision Communications
| Black Canyon City
| Arizona
|-
| • KBME 
| Sportstalk 790
| Fox Sports Radio
| iHeartMedia 
| Houston 
| Texas
|-
| • KBOB
| ESPN 1170 AM
| ESPN Radio
| Townsquare Media
| Davenport
| Iowa
|-
| • KBTA
| CBS Sports Radio 1340
| CBS Sports Radio
| White River Now
| Batesville
| Arkansas
|-
| • KBZO
| TUDN Radio Lubbock 1460
| TUDN Radio
| Entravision Communications
| Lubbock
| Texas
|-
| • KCBF
| 820 Sports
| ESPN Radio
| Last Frontier Mediactive
| Fairbanks
| Alaska
|-
| • KCQL
| Fox Sports 1340
| Fox Sports Radio
| iHeartMedia
| Aztec
| New Mexico
|-
| • KCSF
| Xtra Sports Radio 1300
| CBS Sports Radio
| Cumulus Media
| Colorado Springs
| Colorado
|-
| • KCSP 
| 610 Sports 
| Fox Sports Radio
| Audacy, Inc. 
| Kansas City 
| Missouri
|-
| • KDKA-FM 
| SportsRadio 93.7 The Fan
| CBS Sports Radio
| Audacy, Inc. 
| Pittsburgh 
| Pennsylvania
|-
| • KDKT 
| KDKT Sports Radio 1410 
| CBS Sports Radio 
| Digital Syndicate Network, LLC 
| Bismarck 
| North Dakota
|-
| • KEJO 
| 1240 Joe Radio
| Fox Sports Radio    
| iHeartMedia
| Corvallis 
| Oregon
|-
| • KFBC 
| KFBC AM 1240 
| CBS Sports Radio
| Montgomery Broadcasting LLC
| Cheyenne 
| Wyoming
|-
| • KFLC 
| TUDN Radio Dallas 1270 
| TUDN Radio
| Uforia Audio Network
| Benbrook 
| Texas
|-
| • KFH
| Sports Radio 1240 & 97.5 KFH
| ESPN Radio
| Audacy, Inc.
| Wichita
| Kansas
|-
| • KFNC 
| ESPN Houston 97.5 
| ESPN Radio
| Gow Communications, LLC
|Houston 
| Texas
|-
| • KFNS
| 590 The Fan
| CBS Sports Radio
| Markel Radio Group, LLC
| Wood River
| Illinois
|-
| • KFXN-FM 
| 100.3 FM KFAN: The Fan
| Fox Sports Radio 
| iHeartMedia 
| Minneapolis-St. Paul 
| Minnesota
|-
| • KFXX 
| 1080 The FAN
| ESPN Radio
| Audacy, Inc. 
| Portland 
| Oregon
|-
| • KGA
| Fox Sports 103.5/1510 The Game
| Fox Sports Radio
| Stephens Media Group
| Spokane
| Washington
|-
| • KGB 
| San Diego Sports 760 
| Fox Sports Radio
| iHeartMedia
| San Diego
| California
|-
| • KGBT 
| TUDN Radio McAllen 1530
| TUDN Radio
| Uforia Audio Network
| Harlingen 
| Texas
|-
| • KGIR 
| ESPN Radio 1220
| ESPN Radio
| MRR LICENSE LLC 
| Cape Girardeau 
| Missouri
|-
| • KGME 
| Fox Sports 910
| Fox Sports Radio
| iHeartMedia
| Phoenix 
| Arizona
|-
| • KGMZ-FM 
| 95.7 The Game
| Fox Sports Radio
| Audacy, Inc.
| San Francisco 
| California
|-
| • KGRZ
| Sports Talk 1450
| Fox Sports Radio
| Cherry Creek Radio
| Missoula
| Montana
|-
| • KGSO
| Sports Radio 93.9 FM & 1410 AM KGSO
| Fox Sports Radio
| Steckline Communications Inc.
| Wichita
| Kansas
|-
| • KGU
| AM 760 & FM 95.1 The Shark
| SportsMap
| Salem Media Group
| Honolulu
| Hawaii
|-
| • KGYM 
| 1600 The Gym,106.3 South Gym107.5 North Gym
| ESPN Radio
| KZIA, Inc.
| Cedar Rapids/Iowa City 
| Iowa
|-
| • KHAR
| CBS Sports 590 & 96.7 FM
| CBS Sports Radio
| Alpha Media
| Anchorage
| Alaska
|-
| • KHKA
| CBS Sports Radio 1500AM
| CBS Sports Radio
| Blow Up, LLC
| Honolulu
| Hawaii
|-
| • KHTK 
| Sactown Sports 1140
| CBS Sports Radio
| Bonneville International
| Sacramento 
| California
|-
| • KHTY
| Fox Sports 970/800
| Fox Sports Radio
| iHeartMedia
| Bakersfield
| California
|-
| • KIFM
| ESPN 1320
| ESPN Radio
| Audacy, Inc.
| Sacramento-Yuba City
| California
|-
| • KIKR
| Sports Radio 1450
| CBS Sports Radio
| Cumulus Media
| Beaumont
| Texas
|-
| • KILT 
| Sports Radio 610
| CBS Sports Radio
| Audacy, Inc. 
| Houston 
| Texas
|-
| • KIRO 
| Seattle Sports 710
| ESPN Radio
| Bonneville International
| Seattle 
| Washington
|-
| • KJR 
| Sports Radio 950 KJR
| Fox Sports Radio
| iHeartMedia 
| Seattle
| Washington
|-
| • KJR-FM
| Sports Radio 93.3 KJR
| Fox Sports Radio
| iHeartMedia
| Seattle
| Washington
|-
| • KJTV
| AM 950/100.7 FM
| ESPN Radio
| Ramar Communications
| Lubbock
| Texas
|-
| • KKFN 
| Sportsradio 104.3 The Fan
| ESPN Radio
| Bonneville International 
| Longmont 
| Colorado
|-
| • KKSE-FM
| Altitude Sports 92.5 FM
| Fox Sports Radio
| KSE Radio Ventures, LLC
| Broomfield
| Colorado
|-
| • KLAA 
| Angels Radio AM 830
| Los Angeles Angels and ESPN Radio
| Los Angeles Angels 
| Anaheim 
| California
|-
| • KLAC 
| AM 570 LA Sports 
| Fox Sports Radio    
| iHeartMedia 
| Los Angeles 
| California
|-
| • KLAT 
| TUDN Radio Houston 1010 y 93.3 
| TUDN Radio    
| Uforia Audio Network 
| Houston 
| Texas
|-
| • KLMS
| ESPN 1480 KLMS
| ESPN Radio
| Alpha Media
| Lincoln
| Nebraska
|-
| • KLRZ
| ESPN 100.3
| ESPN Radio
| Coastal Broadcasting of Larose
| Larose
| Louisiana
|-
| • KLWB-FM
| 103.7 The Game
| CBS Sports Radio
| Delta Media Corporation
| Carencro
| Louisiana
|-
| • KMSR 
| Sports Radio 1520
| ESPN Radio
| KMSR, Inc. 
| Grand Forks and Fargo 
| North Dakota
|-
| • KMTT 
| 910 ESPN Portland
| ESPN Radio
| Audacy, Inc. 
| Vancouver 
| Washington
|-
| • KMXA
| TUDN Radio Denver 1090
| TUDN Radio
| Entravision Communications
| Aurora
|Colorado
|-
| • KNBR 
| KNBR 680 & 104.5
| CBS Sports Radio
| Cumulus Media 
| San Francisco 
| California
|-
| • KNBR-FM 
| KNBR 680 & 104.5
| CBS Sports Radio
| Cumulus Media 
| San Francisco 
| California
|-
| • KNFL
| The Fan 740/107.3
| ESPN Radio
| Midwest Communications
| Fargo
| North Dakota
|-
| • KNML
| 610 AM: The Sports Animal
| CBS Sports Radio
| Cumulus Media
| Albuquerque
| New Mexico
|-
| • KOZN 
| 1620 The Zone
| Fox Sports Radio 
| NRG Media
| Omaha 
| Nebraska
|-
| • KPEL
| 103.3 The Goat
| ESPN Radio
| Lafayette
| Louisiana
|-
| • KPLY 
| Fox Sports 630
| Fox Sports Radio
| Lotus Communications
| Reno
| Nevada
|-
| • KPWK
| Fox Sports Radio 1350
| Fox Sports Radio
| iHeartMedia, Inc.
| San Bernardino
| California
|-
| • KQBU-FM
| TUDN Radio Houston 1010 y 93.3
| TUDN Radio
| Uforia Audio Network
| Port Arthur
| Texas
|-
| • KQPN 
| SB Nation Radio 730 Memphis
| SB Nation Radio 
| F.W. Robbert Broadcasting
| Memphis 
| Tennessee
|-
| • KQSM-FM
| 92.1 The Ticket
| CBS Sports Radio
| Cumulus Media
| Fayetteville
| Arkansas
|-
| • KQTM
| ESPN Sports Radio 101-7 The Team
| ESPN Radio
| Team Broadcasting
| Rio Rancho
| New Mexico
|-
| • KRCO
| 92.5 The Ticket
| Fox Sports Radio
| Horizon Broadcasting Group
| Bend
| Oregon
|-
| • KRLD-FM 
| 105.3 The Fan
| CBS Sports Radio
| Audacy, Inc. 
| Dallas 
| Texas
|-
| • KRLV 
| 920 The Game
| SportsMap
| Lotus Broadcasting Corp.
| Las Vegas 
| Nevada
|-
| • KRZY
| TUDN Radio Albuquerque 1450
| TUDN Radio
| Entravision Communications
| Albuquerque
| New Mexico
|-
| • KSEK
| Sports Radio 107.9
| CBS Sports Radio
| Michael D. Landis
| Pittsburg
| Kansas
|-
| • KSOO
| ESPN 102.3 FM & AM 1000
| ESPN Radio
| Townsquare Media
| Sioux Falls
| South Dakota
|-
| • KSPN 
| ESPN LA 710
| ESPN Radio
| Good Karma Brands
| Los Angeles 
| California
|-
| • KSPZ
| The Sports Zone 980
| Fox Sports Radio
| Sandhill Media Group, LLC
| Idaho Falls
| Idaho
|-
| • KSTP 
| SKOR North
| ESPN Radio
| Hubbard Broadcasting 
| Minneapolis-St. Paul 
| Minnesota
|-
| • KSVE
| TUDN Radio El Paso 1650
| TUDN Radio
| Entravision Communications
| El Paso
| Texas
|-
| • KTAR 
| ESPN Phoenix 620 
| ESPN Radio
| Bonneville International
| Phoenix 
| Arizona
|-
| • KTCK 
| SportsRadio 1310 & 96.7 The Ticket
| Fox Sports Radio 
| Cumulus Media 
| Dallas 
| Texas
|- 
| • KTCK-FM
| Sportsradio 1310 & 96.7 The Ticket
| Fox Sports Radio
| Cumulus Media
| Flower Mound
| Texas
|-
| • KTCT
| KNBR 105
| ESPN Radio
| Cumulus Media
| San Mateo
| California
|-
| • KTFM
| San Antonio's Sports Star: ESPN AM 1250 and 94.1 FM
| ESPN Radio
| Alpha Media
| Floresville
| Texas
|- 
| • KTMZ
| Tu Liga Radio 1220| TUDN Radio
| Lotus Communications
| Pomona
| California
|-
| • KTKR
| Ticket 760| Fox Sports Radio
| iHeartMedia
| San Antonio
| Texas
|-
| • KTOP
| Sportsradio 1490 KTOP| CBS Sports Radio
| Cumulus Media
| Topeka
| Kansas
|-
| • KTOQ
| ESPN Rapid City| ESPN Radio
| Haugo Broadcasting, Inc.
| Rapid City
| South Dakota
|-
| • KTSB
| The Blitz 1170| Fox Sports Radio
| Griffin Communications
| Tulsa
| Oklahoma
|-
| • KTTG 
| ESPN Sportsradio 96.3| ESPN Radio
| Pearson Broadcasting
| Mena 
| Arkansas
|-
| • KTZN
| ESPN 550 The Zone| ESPN Radio
| iHeartMedia
| Anchorage
| Alaska
|-
| • KUJZ
| Sportsradio 95.3| CBS Sports Radio
| Cumulus Media
| Eugene
| Oregon
|-
| • KVET 
| AM 1300 The Zone 
| Fox Sports Radio
| iHeartMedia
| Austin 
| Texas 
|-
| • KVSF
| ESPN Santa Fe 1400| ESPN Radio
| Hutton Broadcasting, LLC
| Santa Fe
| New Mexico
|-
| • KVWE
| Panhandle Sports Star| ESPN Radio
| Alpha Media
| Amarillo
| Texas
|-
| • KWKW
| Tu Liga Radio 1330| TUDN Radio
| Lotus Communications Corp.
| Los Angeles
| California
|-
| • KWSN
| Sports Radio 1230 & 98.1 KWSN| Fox Sports Radio
| Midwest Communications
| Sioux Falls
| South Dakota
|-
| • KXFF
| Fox Sports Utah| Fox Sports Radio
| Townsquare Media
| Colorado City
| Arizona
|-
| • KXSP
| AM 590 ESPN Radio| ESPN Radio
| SummitMedia
| Omaha
| Nebraska
|-
| • KXTG 
| 750 The Game| CBS Sports Radio
| Alpha Media
| Portland
| Oregon
|-
| • KXNO 
| 1460 KXNO| Fox Sports Radio
| iHeartMedia
| Des Moines
| Iowa
|-
| • KYRX
| Fox Sports 97.3| Fox Sports Radio
| Withers Broadcasting
| Marble Hill
| Missouri
|-
| • KZDC
| San Antonio's Sports Star: ESPN AM 1250 and 94.1 FM| ESPN Radio
| Alpha Media
| San Antonio
| Texas
|-
| • KZNS 
| 1280 The Zone| Fox Sports Radio
| Larry H. Miller Communications Corporation
| Salt Lake City
| Utah
|}

W

Satellite

Sirius XM
 Sirius XM 80 - ESPN Radio
 Sirius XM 81 - ESPN Xtra
 Sirius XM 82 - Mad Dog Sports Radio
 Sirius XM 83 - Fox Sports Radio
 Sirius XM 84 - ESPNU Radio
 Sirius XM 86 - Sirius XM NBA Radio
 Sirius XM 87 - Sirius XM Fantasy Sports Radio
 Sirius XM 88 - Sirius XM NFL Radio
 Sirius XM 89 - MLB Network Radio
 Sirius XM 90 - Sirius XM NASCAR Radio
 Sirius XM 91 - Sirius XM NHL Network Radio
 Sirius XM 92 - Sirius XM PGA Tour Radio
 Sirius XM 156 - Sirius XM Fight Nation
 Sirius XM 157 - Sirius XM FC
 Sirius XM 206 - CBS Sports Radio
 Sirius XM 211 - Dan Patrick Radio
 Sirius XM 371 - Sirius XM ACC Radio
 Sirius XM 372 - Sirius XM Big Ten Radio
 Sirius XM 373 - Sirius XM Pac-12 Radio
 Sirius XM 374 - Sirius XM SEC Radio
 Sirius XM 375 - Sirius XM Big 12 Radio

Internet sports radio
 RIVAL Radio 809 - sports programming all day long, with a little something special at night.
 Sports Radio America - home to the next generation of independent sports radio talk show producers from around America.
 Victory Lane Radio - racing on Monday nights and Football Frenzy on Wednesday nights.
 National Sports Network -  The only independent sports play-by-play radio network airing NCAA College Basketball games.

Networks

Canada
 Sportsnet Radio
 TSN Radio

United Kingdom
 BBC Radio 5 Live - national public service broadcasting non-commercial network; combination of news/talk/sport format
 BBC Radio 5 Live Sports Extra - supplementary station to the above; exclusive live sports format
 talkSPORT - national commercial network; features sports talk and live sports coverage

United States
CBS Sports Radio
ESPN Radio
Fox Sports Radio
Fútbol de Primera
Motor Racing Network
Performance Racing Network
SportsMap Radio Network
Sports Byline USA
Sports Radio America
TUDN Radio

Defunct networks
Champions Soccer Radio Network (United States)
Enterprise Radio Network (United States)
KRAE (Cheyenne's ESPN sports radio) (USA, Wyoming) - contract ended 2013, now oldies radio
NBC Sports Radio
Réseau Sport Radio Network via Digital Radio Oceane (New Caledonia/Wallis & Futuna)
Sports Fan Radio Network (United States)
ESPN Deportes Radio (United States)
The Team (Canada)
Bradesco Esportes FM (Brazil)
 Macquarie Sports Radio - National, via DAB+ Perth, Sydney 954, Melbourne 1278 & Brisbane 882

Notable syndicated programs

CanadaDon Cherry's GrapelinePrime Time SportsUnited States2 Live StewsThe Ben Maller ShowBoomer and GioThe Dan Le Batard Show with StugotzThe Dan Patrick ShowThe Doug Gottlieb ShowFrom the Press Box to Press RowThe Herd with Colin CowherdJ. T. the BrickThe Jim Rome ShowThe Michael Kay ShowMike and Mike in the MorningMike and the Mad DogMike's OnThe Ryen Russillo ShowThe Tony Kornheiser ShowThe Toucher and Rich Show''

See also
Broadcasting of sports events
Radio personality
Major League Baseball on the radio
College football on radio
National Football League on the radio

References

 
Radio formats